Jennifer Luce (born May 3, 1960 in Montreal, Quebec) is the principal and founder of Luce et Studio Architects in San Diego, California. Luce grew up in Canada and received her bachelor's degree in architecture at Carleton University (1984) before moving to the United States in 1985. At Harvard University Graduate School of Design, she received her Master of Design Studies degree (1994).  She is an IAA (International Academy of Architects) Professor, and has the academic position of Lecturer at Stanford University, teaching architecture at the School of Engineering. Luce was elected to the AIA College of Fellows in 2016.

Firm
While Luce is known for her spare and minimalist work, her studio, Luce et Studio Architects, which she established in 1990, is named "Luce et" for its collaborative studio–client design process. Luce et Studio's body of work includes commissions such as the redesign of the Mingei International Museum in San Diego's Balboa Park, Nissan's new Farmington Hills and LaJolla design studio, as well as corporate and residential commissions, site-specific art, public art, landscape installations, and furniture design.

Luce's work was also included in MIX an architecture and design show in 2009 at the San Diego Museum of Contemporary Art.

References

External links
 Luce et Studio official website

1960 births
Living people
Harvard University alumni
Architects from California
People from Montreal